Maï Traoré (born 24 November 1999) is a Guinean professional footballer who plays as a forward for Belgian First Division A club OH Leuven, on loan from Viking.

Club career

Early career
Traoré started his senior career with Congolese club AC Ujana in 2016. In 2017, he joined Swedish club Vasalunds IF. In the first months he only featured for the club's U19 and U21 teams. He made his senior debut for Vasalund in the 2017–18 Svenska Cupen against Hammarby on 18 February 2018, even scoring a goal. In the 2020 Division 1, he scored 23 goals in 29 matches.

Viking
In March 2021, he transferred to Norwegian Eliteserien club Viking FK, signing a four-year contract. He stayed with Vasalund for the first half of the 2021 season, before joining Viking in August 2021. He was given shirt number 24 at his new club. On 8 August 2021, he made his debut against Kristiansund, coming on as a substitute in the 43rd minute for an injured Veton Berisha. On 16 May 2022, he scored his first goal for the club against Jerv.

In January 2023, Traoré joined Belgian First Division A club OH Leuven on loan until the end of the season with an option to make the move permanent. Traoré made his debut for OH Leuven on 4 February 2023, when he came on in the last minute of the 2–1 away loss to Seraing.

International career
Traoré has featured for the Guinea U23 national team. On 15 November 2018, he scored a goal against Mauritania in the 2019 Africa U-23 Cup of Nations qualification.

Career statistics

Honours
Vasalunds IF
Division 1: 2020

References

External links

1999 births
Living people
Association football forwards
Guinean footballers
Guinea youth international footballers
Guinean expatriate footballers
Guinean expatriate sportspeople in Sweden
Guinean expatriate sportspeople in Norway
Guinean expatriate sportspeople in Belgium
Expatriate footballers in Sweden
Expatriate footballers in Norway
Expatriate footballers in Belgium
Vasalunds IF players
Viking FK players
Oud-Heverlee Leuven players
Division 2 (Swedish football) players
Ettan Fotboll players
Superettan players
Eliteserien players